This was the first edition of the event.

Emilio Sánchez won in the final 6–3, 6–1, defeating Franco Davín.

Seeds

  Jay Berger (Quarterfinals)
  Martín Jaite (first round)
  Emilio Sánchez (champion)
  Andrés Gómez (first round)
  Thomas Muster (quarterfinals)
  Jaime Yzaga (first round)
  Guillermo Pérez Roldán (first round)
  Sergi Bruguera (second round)

Draw

Finals

Top half

Bottom half

External links
 Main draw

Men's Singles